Eleodes acuticauda is a species of desert stink beetle in the family Tenebrionidae, found in southwestern North America.

References

Tenebrionidae
Beetles described in 1851